Provera is an Italian surname. Notable people with the surname include:

Giovanni Marchese di Provera (c.1736–1804), Italian general
Marco Tronchetti Provera (born 1948), Italian businessman

See also
Medroxyprogesterone acetate, sold under the brand name Depo-Provera

Italian-language surnames